Barkmeijer Shipyards is a shipbuilder based in Stroobos in the Netherlands. Barkmeijer mostly builds dry cargo vessels, dredgers, and tankers and specialises in custom builds. In June 2010, Barkmeijer launched an 8300-ton coaster, Marietje Marsilla. In September 2010, Barkmeijer won a contract to build three large pilot vessels for the Dutch pilotage service.

References

External links
 Barkmeijer website

Shipbuilding companies of the Netherlands
Achtkarspelen